Minuscule 142 (in the Gregory-Aland numbering), δ 151 (Soden), is a Greek minuscule manuscript of the New Testament, on parchment leaves. Palaeographically it had been assigned to the 11th century.

Description 

The codex contains the text of the New Testament (except Book of Revelation) on 324 parchment leaves (size ). It containing Book of Psalms. 
The order of New Testament books: Gospels, Acts, Catholic epistles, Pauline epistles. It contains also Hymns and Psalms.

It is neatly written (Scrivener) in one column per page, 30 lines per page. The letters are very small and beautiful. The ink is brown. There are many marginal readings in another ancient hand.

Text 
The Greek text of the codex is a representative of the Byzantine text-type. Hermann von Soden classified it to the textual family Kx. Aland placed it in Category V. According to the Claremont Profile Method it belongs to Kx in Luke 10 and Luke 20. In Luke 1 it has mixed Byzantine text.

History 

The manuscript was examined by Birch (about 1782) and Scholz. C. R. Gregory saw it in 1886.

It is currently housed at the Vatican Library (Vat. gr. 1210), at Rome.

See also 

 List of New Testament minuscules
 Biblical manuscript
 Textual criticism

References

Further reading

External links 
 

Greek New Testament minuscules
11th-century biblical manuscripts
Septuagint manuscripts
Manuscripts of the Vatican Library